Sant Pau may refer to:

Hospital de Sant Pau, Barcelona, Spain
Sant Pau (restaurant), Sant Pol de Mar, Spain
Saint-Paul-de-Vence, France, a commune spelled Sant Pau in Occitan

See also
Saint Paul (disambiguation)